Undercoat may refer to:
 Down hair, or underfur, of an animal
 Primer (paint), applied to a surface before the visible final coat of paint will be applied

See also
 Underseal, thick resilient coating applied to the underbody or chassis of an automobile to protect against impact damage from small stones
 Overcoat (disambiguation)